Buzz!: The Pop Quiz developed by Relentless Software and Sleepydog, is the sixth game in the Buzz! series of quiz games for the PlayStation 2 console. The game features music from the 1990s to the present day. To coincide with the release of Pop Quiz Sony launched a new website called letsplaybuzz.com which allows users to take part in a short 10 question sample game.

Rounds
Name that Band- Listen carefully to an audio clip and identify the band.
Musical Squares- One player chooses a subject and everyone answers questions.
Pass the Bomb!- One person answers a question and when the get it right they pass the bomb to the next player.
Video Stars- Watch a video of pop stars and answer a question about the video.
Pie Fight- First one to get the answer right gets to throw the pie.
Pop Picker- Hit your buzzer on a subject and choose who answers the question before it comes up.
Point Stealer-First person to get the answer right steals points from one player.
What's That Song- A timer is put on and you try to answer  the questions as fast as you can.

External links
 http://www.buzzthegame.com/en-gb/

References

2008 video games
PlayStation 2 games
PlayStation 2-only games
Europe-exclusive video games
Buzz!
Video games developed in the United Kingdom
Multiplayer and single-player video games
Relentless Software games
Sony Interactive Entertainment games